Covergirl is the first album of the German Eurodance group Groove Coverage, released in 2002. It features the 2 singles "Moonlight Shadow" and "God is a Girl" in both radio edit and ballad form. The Radio Edit of "God is a Girl" is a hidden track at the end of the album. The album features a few ballads and dance tracks.

Both Melanie Munch and Verena Rehm provide vocals together for most songs, with the exceptions of "Lullaby for love" which is a Verena solo, and "Moonlight Shadow" which is a Mell solo with Verena providing the piano in the piano version. "Are You Ready" and "The Beat Just Goes'" are club tracks, neither of which Mell or Verena provide vocals for.

Track listing
"Moonlight Shadow" (2001) – 2:49
"Million Tears" – 3:12
"You" – 3:32
"Last Unicorn" – 3:54
"Only Love" – 3:28
"God is a Girl" (Album Version) (2002) – 3:03
"Little June" – 3:37
"Far Away From Home" – 4:18
"Lullaby For Love" –  3:12
"Moonlight Shadow" (Piano) – 4:36 In The Club
"Beat Just Goes" – 3:50
"Are You Ready" (2000) – 9:39
"God is a Girl" (Radio Version) (Hidden track after some seconds of silence at the end of "Are U Ready")
Note: Like "Hit Me", "Are You Ready" is usually not taken into account as a single.

Chart positions

Videos
"Moonlight Shadow"
"God is a Girl"

References

Groove Coverage albums
2002 debut albums